Pastelón is a Dominican and Puerto Rican dish. The dish is prepared differently on both islands.

Ingredients and preparation
The pastelón is a casserole dish consisting of typical Latin Caribbean foods such as plantains, sofrito, and seasoned, mince meat (beef).

Dominican Republic
In the Dominican Republic this dish is made with boiled mashed ripe plantains. The dish is often called Dominican casserole or ripe plantain casserole using typically Dominican style picadillo and cheddar cheese. A layer of mashed plantain is placed on the bottom of a baking pan and covered with picadillo and cheddar another layer of mashed plantain is placed on top covering with picadillo and cheeder. The dish is then covered with aluminum and backed for an additional 35-45 minutes.

Puerto Rico

In Puerto Rico pastelón is considered a Puerto Rican lasagna. Sweet plantains are peeled cut lengthwise in to strips and fried. The plantain replaces lasagna pasta. Minced meat is sautéed with most notably bell peppers, tomatoes, onions, basil, parsley, olives, capers, raisins, garlic, and wine. Plantains are then placed at the bottom of a baking pan layered with meat filling, mozzarella, ricotta, parmesan, bechamel sauce or marinara sauce. This is then repeated about two more times making layers just like a lasagna. It is then baked. Plantains can be replaced with batata or boiled mashed yuca. 

Vegetarian pastelón is popular as well replacing meat with mushrooms, eggplant, squash, string beans, potato or chayote.

References

Puerto Rican cuisine
Dominican Republic cuisine
Caribbean cuisine
Casserole dishes